The 2002–03 New York Knicks season was the 57th season for the Knicks in the National Basketball Association. After missing the playoffs for the first time in 15 years, the Knicks received the seventh pick in the 2002 NBA draft, and selected Brazilian Nenê Hilario, who was soon traded to the Denver Nuggets in exchange for Antonio McDyess. However, the team's hopes for a rebound season took a hit before the start of the season, as McDyess needed knee surgery and was lost for the entire season. Meanwhile, Latrell Sprewell showed up to training camp with a broken hand, and was fined $250,000.

In Don Chaney's first full season as head coach, the Knicks lost ten of their first twelve games, held a 21–27 record at the All-Star break, and missed the NBA Playoffs for the second straight year, finishing tied for fifth in the Atlantic Division with a 37–45 record, which was a 7-game improvement over their previous season. Allan Houston led the team in scoring, averaging 22.5 points per game, while Sprewell averaged 16.4 points, 4.5 assists and 1.4 steals per game, and Kurt Thomas provided the team with 14.0 points and 7.9 rebounds per game. In addition, Howard Eisley contributed 9.1 points and 5.4 assists per game, while Shandon Anderson added 8.4 points per game off the bench, and Othella Harrington averaged 7.7 points and 6.4 rebounds per game. Following the season, Sprewell was traded to the Minnesota Timberwolves.

On February 4, 2003, in a game against the Los Angeles Clippers, Sprewell scored 38 points and made each of his nine three-point field goal attempts. His performance set an NBA single-game record for the most three-pointers made without missing a three-point attempt.

NBA Draft

Roster

Roster notes
Power forward Antonio McDyess missed the entire season due to a knee injury.

Regular season

Record vs. opponents

Player stats

Regular season

Awards and records

Transactions

Trades

Free agents

Source:

References

New York Knicks seasons
New York Knicks
New York Knicks
New York Knick
2000s in Manhattan
Madison Square Garden